The Lanier Library Association is a subscription library in Tryon, North Carolina. Established on 9 January 1889, it is named for Sidney Lanier.  The Lanier Library Association is one of only sixteen solely membership libraries left in the United States.  It is also known as a community library association.

History
In 1889, five ladies from Tryon, North Carolina met and discussed the community’s need for a library and subsequently decided to create a club that would offer a place for intellectual and cultural engagement for their community.  The club’s first meeting was held on January 9, 1889.  The library's first two books were two volumes of poems by Sidney Lanier, donated to the library by his widow, Mary. The club's original membership dues were $0.60 per year.  This community membership library would be housed in many places over the years:  a church basement, the post office and various stores.  
In December 1905 a lot on Melrose Avenue would become the eventual permanent location of The Lanier Library Association, as we know it today.

As membership increased, so did the need for additional space and resources.  What was once just a club, founded by five ladies, grew through membership, donations and a need for more space for books!  The Lanier Library does not receive any public funding, but relies solely on its membership dues and additional donations.

Membership

Membership fees are critical for The Lanier Library Association, as they do not receive any forms of government support. The Lanier Library Association is a non-profit organization. There are different levels of membership they offer.  There is a complete list of the different membership levels offered on The Lanier Library Associations official website. Individual memberships start at $50 annually and there are additional levels that go up to $2500+.

References

External links
 Official website

1890 establishments in North Carolina
Libraries in North Carolina
Subscription libraries in the United States
Education in Polk County, North Carolina
Buildings and structures in Polk County, North Carolina
Libraries established in 1890